The St. Stephen's Episcopal Church at 812 Blaine Avenue in Chandler, Oklahoma (also known as Chandler Seventh-Day Adventist Church) is a historic church building. It was built in 1899 and added to the National Register of Historic Places in 2000.

It was deemed significant as "the best example of a small, stone Gothic Revival church building in Lincoln County, Oklahoma.

It is located in a residential neighborhood, across from the Carpenter Gothic First Presbyterian Church of Chandler, which was build it in 1897 and is also National Register-listed.  The Presbyterian church was one of few buildings in Chandler that survived a tornado on March 30, 1897.

Its National Register nomination in 2000 noted that "St. Stephen's remains in use today because, unlike most church buildings of its size, it has not become obsolete due to either a dwindling or burgeoning congregation, or become obsolete because it became too small for its congregation. The church was owned by the Protestant Episcopal Cathedral until
1946, when it was bought by the Society of Friends. In 1959, ownership changed to the Oklahoma Conference Corporation of the Seventh-Day Adventists."

References

Episcopal churches in Oklahoma
Seventh-day Adventist churches in the United States
Churches on the National Register of Historic Places in Oklahoma
Gothic Revival church buildings in Oklahoma
Churches completed in 1899
19th-century Episcopal church buildings
National Register of Historic Places in Lincoln County, Oklahoma
Chandler, Oklahoma